The 2021 United States World Team Trials for wrestling were held at the Pinnacle Bank Arena of Lincoln, Nebraska, from September 11 to 12, 2021. This event determined the representative of the United States of America for the 2021 World Championships at each weight class and style.

Weight classes contested 
Due to the delay of the 2020 Summer Olympics that ended up taking place in August 2021, with the US Olympic Team Trials for wrestling taking place in April 2021, the 2021 US World Team Trials took place months later than the yearly event usually does, and the same applies to the 2021 World Championships, which will start on October 2. USA Wrestling announced on the 2021 World Team Selection Procedures that "The 2020 Tokyo Olympic Medalist, if competing at the same weight class, will receive the automatic selection to the 2021 World Team at that same weight." Every American 2020 Olympic medalist accepted their berth with the exception of men's freestyle 125 kg gold medalist Gable Steveson, who declined in order to pursue ventures outside of amateur wrestling. As a result, there were no events at; 57, 74, 86 and 97 kilograms in men's freestyle and at 50, 57, 68 and 76 kilograms in women's freestyle.

Tournament format 

 Challenge Tournament–(single elimination)- The first part of the trials determined who advanced over to the best–of–three finale and it took place in the first day of competition.
 Championship Series–(best‐of‐3 match final wrestle‐off)- In the second part of the trials, the finals which determined the ultimate winner took place, in the second day of competition.

Medal summary

Men's freestyle

Women's freestyle

Men's Greco–Roman

Brackets (incomplete)

Men's freestyle

61 kg

65 kg

70 kg

79 kg

92 kg

125 kg

References 

Wrestling competitions in the United States
Sports in Lincoln, Nebraska
2021 in sports in Nebraska